Poul Jørgensen (born 2 March 1944 in Silkeborg, Denmark) is professor of chemistry at the Department of Chemistry, Aarhus University (AU), Denmark and director of the qLEAP Center for Theoretical Chemistry at AU, which was established in April 2012. 
Jørgensen has made seminal contributions to the field of electronic structure theory. He is also one of the main authors of the DALTON program and a member of the International Academy of Quantum Molecular Science.

Research
Jørgensen's list of peer-reviewed publications contains numerous self-contained articles which, in many cases, have become central sources within the field of electronic structure theory. His areas of research have been diverse and include work on: 

 
multi-configurational self-consistent field (MCSCF) methods 
Lagrangian techniques for molecular property calculations and analytic derivatives 
time-independent and time-dependent linear and non-linear response function theory 
coupled cluster perturbation theory 
calculation of magnetic molecular properties using gauge invariant methods 
showing and explaining the divergence of Møller–Plesset perturbation theory 
benchmarking the accuracy of electronic structure models 
basis set extrapolation for accurate calculations of energies 
linear-scaling coupled cluster algorithms 
optimization algorithms for Hartree–Fock and Kohn–Sham theory 
localization of Hartree–Fock orbitals.

Selected published works
Jørgensen has written more than 350 publications in peer-reviewed international journals, in addition to four books (3 co-authored and 1 edited),

 
 
 
 

He had more than 19,000 citations and a h-index of 68 (according to ISI Web of Knowledge database).

He has also organized the "Sostrup Summer School - Quantum Chemistry and Molecular Properties" alongside Trygve Helgaker and Jeppe Olsen biannually since 1990.

Academic career

Jørgensen's career has been outlined in a Special Issue of Advances in Quantum Chemistry

1972–73 PostDoc with Professor Yngve Öhrn in Florida
1974 PostDoc with Professor Jack Simons in Utah 
1974–75 PostDoc with Professor V. McKoy in Pasadena
1976 Associate Professor of Chemistry, Aarhus University
2001 Professor of Chemistry, Aarhus University
2010 Advanced Research Professor of Chemistry, Aarhus University

Directorships
2004–07: Director of "Centre for Theoretical Chemistry", funded by the Danish Natural Science Research Council
2006–11: Director of "The Lundbeck Foundation Centre for Theoretical Chemistry" funded by the Lundbeck Foundation
2012–17: Director of "The qLEAP Centre for Theoretical Chemistry" funded by the European Research Council

Awards
Appointed "Knight of the Order of the Dannebrog" by the Queen of Denmark in 2010 for his outstanding contributions to science.
Elected member of the International Academy of Quantum Molecular Science (2012).
Awards for extraordinary scientific accomplishment by the International Conference of Computation Methods in Science and Engineering (ICCMSE) (2006).
Honoured by Thomson Scientific and the Danish Library Association as the most cited author in chemistry in Denmark during the period 1990–2004.
Rigmor and Carl Holst-Knudsens Videnskabspris, Aarhus University (1986).

References

External links
 His International Academy of Quantum Molecular Science page
 

Living people
1944 births
Danish chemists
Theoretical chemists
Knights of the Order of the Dannebrog
Members of the International Academy of Quantum Molecular Science
Academic staff of Aarhus University
Computational chemists
People from Silkeborg